Aspirin/meprobamate (trade name Equagesic ) is a combination drug indicated for short-term pain treatment accompanied by tension or anxiety in patients with musculoskeletal disorders or tension headache.

Adverse effects

Combinations
There also appears to be a combination with ethoheptazine, an opioid analgesic.

Problems
Equagesic was discontinued in the United States, possibly because of its toxic effects. Specifically, meprobamate. The Equagesic drug was credited with the sudden death of actor Bruce Lee in 1973. Lee suffered a fatal hypersensitive reaction to one of the prescription drug's ingredients while working in Hong Kong.

References

Combination drugs
Analgesics
Aspirin